Yury Pavlovich Klyuyev (born 7 October 1960) is a Soviet speed skater. He competed in two events at the 1988 Winter Olympics.

References

External links
 

1960 births
Living people
Soviet  male speed skaters
Olympic speed skaters of the Soviet Union
Speed skaters at the 1988 Winter Olympics
Speed skaters from Moscow